Pakenham Upper is a rural locality in Melbourne, Victoria, Australia,  south-east of Melbourne's Central Business District, located within the Shire of Cardinia local government area. Pakenham Upper recorded a population of 1,196 at the 2021 census.

History

Pakenham Upper is situated in the Kulin nation traditional Aboriginal country. The Boon Wurrung people are local custodians within the Kulin nation. The origin of the suburb name is from Sir Edward Pakenham and the geographic position north of the Pakenham main settlement.

Originally known as Gembrook South, the settlement of Pakenham Upper is dated from 1872. The Gembrook South post office was established in 1882 and was renamed as the Pakenham Upper post office in 1913.

Amenities
 Pakenham Upper Community Hall 
 Pakenham Upper Riding Club 
 Pakenham Upper Toomuc Cricket Club

See also
 Shire of Pakenham – Pakenham Upper was previously within this former local government area.

References 

Shire of Cardinia